Dunavarsány is a town in Pest County, Budapest metropolitan area, Hungary.

Twin towns – sister cities

Dunavarsány is twinned with:
 Gemmingen, Germany (1997)
 Slavec, Slovakia (2002)  
 Chetfalva, Ukraine (2008)

References

External links

 in Hungarian
Street map 

Populated places in Pest County
Budapest metropolitan area